The men's 200 metres at the 2008 Summer Olympics took place on 18–20 August at the Beijing National Stadium. There were 63 competitors from 53 nations. Jamaican Usain Bolt set a new world record of 19.30 seconds in the final, and won by the largest margin of victory (0.66 seconds, after two disqualifications) in an Olympic 200 metres final (previously, Walter Tewksbury had a 0.6 seconds margin of victory in the first Olympic 200 m final in 1900). It was Jamaica's first victory in the event since 1976 and second overall, matching Canada and Italy for second-most (after the United States' 17 wins). The apparent silver and bronze medalists, Churandy Martina of the Netherlands Antilles and Wallace Spearmon of the United States, were both disqualified. Those medals went to Americans Shawn Crawford and Walter Dix, who had been fourth and fifth across the finish line; Crawford gave his silver medal to Martina afterward. Crawford was the 10th man to win two medals in the 200 metres, and the third for whom those medals were gold and silver; nobody had yet won two gold medals.

Background

This was the 25th appearance of the event, which was not held at the first Olympics in 1896 but has been on the program ever since. Two of the eight finalists from the 2004 Games returned: gold medalist Shawn Crawford of the United States and sixth-place finisher Stéphane Buckland of Mauritius. 2005 World Champion Justin Gatlin was serving a doping suspension; 2007 World Champion Tyson Gay had suffered a hamstring injury at the U.S. trials and did not make the team. Without those top Americans, the heavy favorite was Usain Bolt of Jamaica. Bolt had competed in 2004 but had struggled through injury and did not make the quarterfinals; in 2008, he was healthy and, by the time of the 200 metres, had already set a world record in the 100 metres in Beijing.

Ecuador, Jordan, Malta, and Uzbekistan each made their debut in the event. The United States made its 24th appearance, most of any nation, having missed only the boycotted 1980 Games.

Summary

Bolt won by over half a second, even before a pair of disqualifications, breaking the world record in the event. Controversy arose within minutes after the medal race when American Wallace Spearmon, who had finished third in 19.95 seconds, was disqualified for stepping out of his lane. United States officials filed a protest, but withdrew it after seeing the video and noticing that silver medalist Churandy Martina (19.82 seconds), who had won the second ever Olympic medal for the Netherlands Antilles, also stepped out of his lane. They filed an appeal, which after more than an hour of deliberation was accepted.
 On March 6, 2009, the Court of Arbitration for Sport rejected an appeal by the National Olympic Committee of the Netherlands Antilles against Martina's disqualification. American Shawn Crawford, who had been awarded the silver medal, reportedly gave his medal to Martina on August 28, 2008 in a show of sportsmanship.

Qualification

Each National Olympic Committee (NOC) was able to enter up to three entrants providing they had met the A qualifying standard (20.59) in the qualifying period (1 January 2007 to 23 July 2008). NOCs were also permitted to enter one athlete providing he had met the B standard (20.75) in the same qualifying period.

The qualifying standards were 20.59 seconds (A standard) and 20.75 seconds (B standard).

Competition format

The competition used the four round format introduced in 1920: heats, quarterfinals, semifinals, and a final. The "fastest loser" system introduced in 1960 was used in the heats and quarterfinals.

There were 8 heats of 8 or 9 runners each (the first time that 9 runners were placed in a heat), with the top 3 men in each advancing to the quarterfinals along with the next 8 fastest overall. The quarterfinals consisted of 4 heats of 8 athletes each; the 3 fastest men in each heat and the next 4 fastest overall advanced to the semifinals. There were 2 semifinals, each with 8 runners. The top 4 athletes in each semifinal advanced. The final had 8 runners. The races were run on a 400 metre track.

Records

Prior to this competition, the existing world and Olympic records were as follows:

Usain Bolt set a new world record in the final, running the race in 19.30 seconds.

Schedule

For the second Games, the three-day schedule with semifinals and final on different day was used.

All times are China Standard Time (UTC+8)

Results

All times shown are in seconds.

Heats

The first round was held on 18 August. The first three runners of each heat (Q) plus the next eight overall fastest runners (q) qualified for the quarterfinals.

Heat 1

Heat 2

Heat 3

Heat 4

Heat 5

Heat 6

Heat 7

Heat 8

Quarterfinals

The quarterfinals were held on 18 August. First 3 in each heat (Q) and the next 4 fastest (q) advance to the semifinals.

Quarterfinal 1

Quarterfinal 2

Quarterfinal 3

Quarterfinal 4

Semifinals

The semifinals were held on 19 August. First 4 in each heat (Q) advance to the Final.

Semifinal 1

Semifinal 2

Final

References

External links
Results

Athletics at the 2008 Summer Olympics
200 metres at the Olympics
Men's events at the 2008 Summer Olympics